Pseudoceros lindae, common name Linda's flatworm, is a marine Flatworm species that belongs to the Pseudocerotidae family.

Description 
The upper surface of the thick and elongated body shows a wine color (burgundy) background with turquoise margins and a variable number oval to round yellow-golden spots. This pattern may vary from one individual to another especially in the density of points. The ventral side is light purple. Each pseudotentacle is formed by a broad simple fold of the anterior margins of the body. Also pharynx is formed by highly elaborated folds. This species is a simultaneous hermaphrodite, so it can make cross fecundation. There is a single male reproductive organ, that penetrates in any part of the mate's body, and the females have a short vagina directed backwards.

Behaviour and feeding 
These flatworms are benthic and diurnals. Because of their aposematic colors, they have no fear to crawl around to feed. "Pseudoceros lindae" feeds on various colonial ascidians.

Distribution 
This species is widespread in the tropical Indo-Pacific, from Madagascar and the eastern coast of Africa to Indonesia, Philippines and the Great Barrier Reef of Australia.

Habitat 
It can be found in the external slope or top coral reef.

Bibliography 
 Leslie Newman & Lester Cannon, 1994 : Pseudoceros and Pseudobiceros (Platyhelminthes, Polycladida, Pseudocerotidae) from Eastern Australia and Papua New Guinea. Memoirs of the Queensland Museum, vol. 37, p. 205–266
 Leslie Newman & Lester Cannon, "Marine Flatworms",CSIRO publishing,2003,
 Neville Coleman, "Marine life of Maldives",Atoll editions,2004,
 Andrea & Antonnella Ferrrari,"Macrolife",Nautilus publishing,2003,

References

External links 
 Life Desk, Pseudoceros lindae 
 Discover Life, Pseudoceros lindae 
 Turbellarian taxonomic database, Pseudoceros lindae
 Nudipixel
 

Turbellaria
Animals described in 1994